Akabane (Japanese: 赤羽), is a neighborhood in Kita, Tokyo, 
Its postal code is 115–0045. The residential neighborhood is popular due to direct train access to central Tokyo.

Education
Akabane's elementary and junior high schools are operated by the City of Kita Board of Education.

Different portions of Akabane are zoned to different elementary schools depending on what address the resident has:
 Akabane Elementary School (赤羽小学校)
 No. 4 Iwabuchi Elementary School (第四岩淵小学校)

All of Akabane is zoned to Akabaneiwabuchi Junior High School (赤羽岩淵中学校).

Transport
JR East trains stop at Akabane Station.

References

External links
 Government website

Kita, Tokyo